Akbarpur is a town in Kanpur Dehat district in the state of Uttar Pradesh, India.

Demographics

 India census, Akbarpur had a population of 17,368. Males constitute 53% of the population and females 47%. Akbarpur has an average literacy rate of 57%, lower than the national average of 59.5%; with 58% of the males and 42% of females literate. 18% of the population is under 6 years of age.

Connectivity

Railways
Akbarpur is not Railway station but it is connected with Rura (NCR) Railway station. Rura is connected with express &super fast trains to Delhi, Howrah, Lucknow.Agra, Patna, Meerut, Jammu etc.  Rura is a main Railway Station of Akbarpur, (Kanpur Dehat) . Another mini railway station is Lalpur.

Airways
Kanpur Airport is nearest airport.

Roadways
Golden Quadrilateral National Highway 19 (India) passes through Akbarpur city District Kanpur Dehat. Which is connected to all major cities of India. Lucknow-Jhansi another National High Way passes through its. A C, non  A C & Sleeper buses are available here for different cities of India.

Poet
Asharfi Lal Mishra is a Hindi poet. He wrote a poem named "Lal Shatak (Dohe)" having 100 Dohe. This poetry is published in Amarujala.com in two parts. Many free poems also published in Amarujala.com   He is a poet, author and blogger too. His poetry named Kavy sangrah is published in Navbharat Times.com.

Educational institutions
Akbarpur Inter College
Akbarpur Girls Inter College.  
 Akbarpur Degree College
 Government Degree College, Akbarpur

Festivals
All national festivals, Holi, Diwali, Mahashivratri, Shri Krishna Janmashtami, Ramnavami, Makara Sankranti, Eid-ul-Fitr, Rakshabandhan, Hanuman jayanti and other local ones such as Nag-Panchmi, Navratri, Durga Puja are celebrated with enthusiasm. A Glimpse of Bengal can be seen in the City of Akbarpur. During the Durga puja celebrations several cultural events are organized and is celebrated on a large scale. Thousands of people daily visits the puja pandal to get the blessings of Goddess Durga. Savitri vrat and Navratri vrat are main festival of women's of city Akbarpur, At the time of savitri vrat women takes 101 round of banyan tree.
 Vijyadashmi is most famous festival of the city Akbarpur. It is celebrated continuously one month. A fair is also organized for 15 days.

Historical places

Shukul Talab: the pond was constructed in 1578 by Sheetal Shukla  
 Kalaran Talab: the pond was constructed by Chhabba Kalar.

Sacred places
Kalka Devi Mandir: a fair is organized hear at the time of Navratra Puja.
 Shani Dev near Hindi Bhawan on Rura road.
 Shiv Temple at Shukla Talab

Hindi Bhawan
It is a convention center of town Akbarpur.

Tourist attractions
There are many tourist attraction like tilas at Yamuna River.The Shivli Lake (Salt Water lake) is a major tourist spot with temples and islands in the center of the lake. It is situated in western part of city about 20 km away.

Growth of industries
Due to industrial Kanpur city there is very much growth of industries in eastern side of city.

Kanpur Dehat is a quite backward district of the state. There are only three developed blocks where industrial areas & estates are available. These are Jainpur, Sarvankhera and Rania in Akbarpur Tehsils. Besides above, some industrial development has also taken place in Bhognipur and Amraudha. The important articles manufactured in the towns of Ramabai Nagar are leather goods, handloom cloth, medicines, shoes. aluminium utensils, raw leather, tractor trolly, mustard oil, flour and agricultural implements. The important commodities which are imported into the towns of the district are leather, iron, foodgrains, yarn, wood, cloth and fertilizer etc.

Industrial Area & Estates

The main industrial area is situated at Jainpur in Akbarpur Block at about 38 km. from Kanpur City on the both sides of Kalpi Road. The U.P. State Industrial Development Corporation (UPSIDC) has developed a large industrial area measuring about 294.70 acres in Jainpur. Similarly two industrial areas measuring 10.52 and total 15.70 acres have been developed by UPSIDC at site no.1 and 2 in Rania, housing 47 and 68 developed plots respectively. Besides, another industrial Estate has been developed in Rania in which 100 developed Plots and 8 Sheds are available. The details are given below:-

Sister cities
Akbarpur has friendly relations with Sudbury, Massachusetts in the United States.

Gallery

References

External links
 kanpurdehat.nic.in 

Cities and towns in Kanpur Dehat district